was a Japanese mathematician and historian of Japanese mathematics. He was born in Tokushima, Japan.

He was the founder of the Tohoku Mathematical Journal.

References

Further reading

External links
 The Extremal Chords of an Oval, by TSURUICHI HAYASHI, Sendai.
 A Remark on the integral Equation solved by Mr. Hirakawa, by TSURUICHI HAYASHI in Sendai.

1873 births
1935 deaths
19th-century Japanese mathematicians
20th-century Japanese mathematicians
Historians of mathematics